State Route 244 (SR 244) is an unsigned state highway in the U.S. state of California located northeast of Sacramento. It serves as a short freeway connection between the Interstate 80/Interstate 80 Business junction and Auburn Boulevard (the old Lincoln Highway - former U.S. Route 40/U.S. Route 99E). SR 244 was first added to the state highway system in 1959 as Legislative Route 288, and was renumbered as SR 244 in the 1964 renumbering. Portions of this route have been removed from the system as recently as 1994.

Route description
SR 244 starts just east of the westernmost ramps to the Watt Avenue exit off I-80. Just east of this, there are several connector ramps to both I-80 and Business I-80 as SR 244 passes under the terminus of Business I-80. SR 244 terminates at Auburn Boulevard, having just entered the Sacramento city limits near Renfree Park.

SR 244 is part of the National Highway System, a network of highways that are considered essential to the country's economy, defense, and mobility by the Federal Highway Administration.

History
Legislative Route 288 was defined in 1959 as a proposed route from pre-1964 Legislative Route 3 and pre-1964 Legislative Route 242 (now I-80 and SR 51) northeast of Sacramento east to pre-1964 Legislative Route 249 (unbuilt State Route 65 - approximately Sunrise Boulevard) near Fair Oaks. In the 1964 renumbering, this was assigned the number Route 244.

In 1965, an extension was defined from SR 65 east to U.S. Route 50. In 1972 a series of "volatile" public hearings took place where local residents protested the construction of this route among others being proposed in the Sacramento area. The project was expected to cost $40 million to construct and the resulting freeway would be eight lanes wide. This extension to U.S. Route 50 was removed in 1975, and the route's definition was truncated to end at Fair Oaks Boulevard near San Juan Avenue. The public forums ended in mid-1976 after the Board of Supervisors abandoned plans for all three routes. It was truncated further to Auburn Boulevard, its present terminus, in 1994.

The bridges along the route date from 1971, a year after the bridges on I-80 to the west; that part of I-80 was Interstate 880 until 1981.

Exit list

See also

References

External links

California @ AARoads.com - State Route 244
Caltrans: Route 244 highway conditions
California Highways: SR 244

244
State Route 244
244
Transportation in Sacramento, California